Dives may refer to:

 Dives, Oise, a French commune of the Oise département
 Dives (river), a river in Normandy
 Dives-sur-Mer, a commune in Normandy
 Dives (bird), a genus of New World blackbirds
 Dis Pater, Roman god of the underworld, contracted from Dives Pater ("Father of Riches")
 Dives, 'the rich man' in the parable of the rich man and Lazarus
 Marcus Licinius Crassus (c. 115–53 BC), a Roman politician, who was known as Dives, meaning "The Rich" or "Moneybags"
 Chrysophylax Dives, "Goldward the Rich," the dragon in Farmer Giles of Ham
 Lewis Dives, English Member of Parliament
 SU Dives, a French association football club founded in 1929

See also
 
 
 Dive (disambiguation)